Rodney Allen Brooks (born 30 December 1954) is an Australian roboticist, Fellow of the Australian Academy of Science, author, and robotics entrepreneur, most known for popularizing the actionist approach to robotics. He was a Panasonic Professor of Robotics at the Massachusetts Institute of Technology and former director of the MIT Computer Science and Artificial Intelligence Laboratory. He is a founder and former Chief Technical Officer of iRobot and co-Founder, Chairman and Chief Technical Officer of Rethink Robotics (formerly Heartland Robotics) and currently is the co-founder and Chief Technical Officer of Robust.AI (founded in 2019).

Life
Brooks received a M.A. in pure mathematics from Flinders University of South Australia. In 1981, he received a PhD in Computer Science from Stanford University under the supervision of Thomas Binford. He has held research positions at Carnegie Mellon University and MIT and a faculty position at Stanford University. He joined the faculty of MIT in 1984. He was Panasonic Professor of Robotics at the Massachusetts Institute of Technology. He was director of the MIT Computer Science and Artificial Intelligence Laboratory (1997–2007), previously the "Artificial Intelligence Laboratory".

In 1997, Brooks and his work were featured in the film Fast, Cheap & Out of Control.

Brooks became a member of the National Academy of Engineering in 2004 for contributions to the foundations and applications of robotics, including the establishment of consumer and hazardous environment robotics industries.

Work

Academic work

Instead of computation as the ultimate conceptual metaphor that helped artificial intelligence become a separate discipline in the scientific community, he proposed that action or behavior are more appropriate to be used in robotics. Critical of applying the computational metaphor, even to the fields where the action metaphor is more appropriate, he wrote in 2008 that:

Some of my colleagues have managed to recast Pluto's orbital behavior as the body itself carrying out computations on forces that apply to it. I think we are perhaps better off using Newtonian mechanics (with a little Einstein thrown in) to understand and predict the orbits of planets and others. It is so much simpler.

In his 1990 paper, "Elephants Don't Play Chess", Brooks argued that in order for robots to accomplish everyday tasks in an environment shared by humans, their higher cognitive abilities, including abstract thinking emulated by symbolic reasoning, need to be based on the primarily sensory-motor coupling (action) with the environment, complemented by the proprioceptive sense which is a key component in hand–eye coordination, pointing out that:
Over time there's been a realization that vision, sound-processing, and early language are maybe the keys to how our brain is organized.

Industrial work
Brooks was an entrepreneur before leaving academia to found Rethink Robotics. He was one of ten founders of Lucid Inc., and worked with them until the company's closure in 1993. Before Lucid closed, Brooks had founded iRobot with former students Colin Angle and Helen Greiner.

Robots

He experimented with off-the-shelf components, such as Fischertechnik and Lego, and tried to make robots self-replicate by putting together clones of themselves using the components. His robots include mini-robots used in oil wells explorations without cables, the robots that searched for survivors at Ground Zero in New York, and the robots used in medicine doing robotic surgery.

Allen
In the late 1980s, Brooks and his team introduced Allen, a robot using subsumption architecture.  Brooks' work focused on engineering intelligent robots to operate in unstructured environments, and understanding human intelligence through building humanoid robots.

Baxter

Introduced in 2012 by Rethink Robotics, an industrial robot named Baxter was intended as the robotic analogue of the early personal computer designed to safely interact with neighboring human workers and be programmable for the performance of simple tasks. The robot stopped if it encountered a human in the way of its robotic arm and has a prominent off switch which its human partner can push if necessary. Costs were projected to be the equivalent of a worker making $4 an hour.

Bibliography

 .

 Alternative 

K. Warwick "Out of the Shady age: the best of robotics compilation", Review of Cambrian Intelligence: the early history of AI, by R A Brooks, Times Higher Educational Supplement, p. 32, 15 September 2000.
The Relationship Between Matter and Life (in Nature 409, pp. 409–411; 2001)
Flesh and Machines: How Robots Will Change Us (Pantheon, 2002) 

Brooks contributed one chapter to Architects of Intelligence: The Truth About AI from the People Building it, Packt Publishing, 2018, by the American futurist Martin Ford.

See also 

 Nouvelle AI

References

External links
 
 Rethink Robotics
 
 
 Rodney Brooks: Why we will rely on robots (TED2013)
 Rodney Brooks: Robots will invade our lives (TED2003)
 Home page
 The Deep Question Interview with Rodney Brooks by Edge
 The Past and Future of Behavior Based Robotics Podcast Interview with Rodney Brooks by Talking Robots
 Intelligence Without Reason seminal criticism of Von Neumann computing architecture
 BBC article
 CSAIL Rodney A. Brooks Biography
 MIT: Cog Shop
 Rodney A. Brooks Biography
 Rodney A. Brooks Publications
 Rodney's Robot Revolution (2008)
Rodney Brooks on Artificial Intelligence - EconTalk podcast interview with Rodney Brooks.  Released Sep 24, 2018.

1954 births
Living people
American computer scientists
Artificial intelligence researchers
Australian atheists
Australian computer scientists
Australian roboticists
Carnegie Mellon University faculty
Australian cognitive scientists
Fellows of the American Academy of Arts and Sciences
Fellows of the American Association for the Advancement of Science
Fellows of the Association for Computing Machinery
Fellows of the Association for the Advancement of Artificial Intelligence
Fellows of the Australian Academy of Science
Fellows of the Australian Academy of Technological Sciences and Engineering
Flinders University alumni
Massachusetts Institute of Technology faculty
Members of the United States National Academy of Engineering
Researchers of artificial life
Stanford University School of Engineering alumni
The Futurist people
American roboticists
People from Adelaide